ICEYE is a Finnish microsatellite manufacturer. ICEYE was founded in 2014 as a spin-off of Aalto University's University Radio Technology Department, and is based in Espoo.

The CEO and co-founder of ICEYE is Rafał Modrzewski.

History 
In 2015, ICEYE demonstrated that synthetic-aperture radar could be used to monitor hazardous ice features such as pack ice. In the same year, on 1 September, ICEYE received a €2,4M grant from the European Union's Horizon 2020 programme for SMEs with the goal "to integrate, pilot test and demonstrate the ICEYE SAR system in its final form as a microsatellite in order to attract private investment for launching."

In August 2017, ICEYE raised US$13 million in capital, including from the Finnish Funding Agency for Innovations.

In 2019, the founders of ICEYE and Aalto staff involved were awarded the Finnish Engineering Award. The achievement was called "a breakthrough in Finnish space technology" in the award citation. The award is given annually by the Academic Engineers and Architects in Finland TEK, the main trade union and learned society for university graduates in Finland, and comes with a cash prize of €30,000.

In October 2019, ICEYE started offering commercial access to its 1-metre resolution SAR-imagery, and operated 3 SAR satellites.

In December 2020, ICEYE sold two satellites (X18, X19 or X20) to the Brazilian Air Force, these satellites were launched in May 2022 on SpaceX's Transporter-5 mission. The Brazilians named these satellites Carcará 1 and Carcará 2.

In August 2022, during the Russian invasion of Ukraine, ICEYE signed a contract with the Serhiy Prytula  that would give the Armed Forces of Ukraine access to one of its satellites.

Satellites 
On 12 January 2018, a PSLV-XL rocket on PSLV-C40 mission carried ICEYE-X1 (also known as ICEYE POC1, COSPAR 2018-004D; POC stands for "Proof Of Concept") into orbit from the Satish Dhawan Space Centre. ICEYE-X1 was the first satellite (70 kg) under 100 kg to carry a synthetic-aperture radar, and was the first Finnish commercial satellite.

The second satellite, ICEYE-X2 (ICEYE POC2, COSPAR 2018-099AU) was launched into orbit on 3 December 2018, at 18:34 UTC by a SpaceX Falcon 9 Block 5 rocket. The launch took place from the Vandenberg, SLC-4E.

The third ICEYE X payload was launched on 5 May 2019 on an Electron rocket from Rocket Lab Launch Complex 1, in New Zealand. The payload, called ICEYE-X3, was integrated into the Harbinger satellite (the satellite is also known as ICEYE X3, ICEYE POC3, COSPAR 2019-026E), a proof-of-concept prototype for a York Space Systems' S-class satellite bus. The Harbinger was launched on its demonstration mission, and the payloads integrated into the satellite included the ICEYE X3, BridgeSat's optical communications payload and Enpulsion of Austria's Field Emission Electric Propulsion system. The launch was conducted as the STP-27RD mission of the Space Test Program (STP) of the United States Army Space and Missile Defense Command, who sponsored the launch. The ICEYE-X3 radar payload had communications issues related to bus communications. These were reportedly solved.

The fourth and fifth satellite, ICEYE-X4 (COSPAR 2019-038D) and ICEYE-X5 (COSPAR 2019-038C) were launched on 5 July 2019 by a Soyuz-2-1b rocket from Vostochny Cosmodrome Site 1S.

The next launch occurred on September 28, 2020, with Soyuz-2-1v from Plesetsk. This put ICEYE-X6 and ICEYE-X7 satellites into orbit. On 24 January 2021 three new satellites (ICEYE-X8, ICEYE-X9 and ICEYE-X10) were launched from Cape Canaveral SLC40 as part of record setting Falcon 9 Flight 106 (i.e. Transporter-1 mission). One of these, the ICEYE-X10, is actually a US-built version of the ICEYE satellites developed by R2 Space for the US government and has been renamed XR-1.

The cooperation between SpaceX and ICEYE continued with 6 more satellites launched with Falcon 9 Block 5 rockets, 4 on 30 June 2021 as part of the Transporter-2 mission (ICEYE-X11, ICEYE-X12, ICEYE-X13 and ICEYE-X15) and 2 on 13 January 2022 as part of the Transporter-3 mission (ICEYE-X14 and ICEYE-X16). Another 5 have been launched on 25 May 2022 as part of Transporter-5 (ICEYE-X17, X18, X19, X20 and X24) and 3 on 3 January 2023 as part of Transporter-6 (ICEYE-X21, X22 and X27).

ICEYE is attempting to develop a satellite constellation of 18 microsatellites equipped with synthetic-aperture radars in collaboration with the European Space Agency (ESA). ICEYE uses commercially available off-the-shelf components as much as possible, despite increased risk of hardware failure.

References

External links 
 

Manufacturing companies based in Espoo
Spacecraft manufacturers
Remote sensing companies
Synthetic aperture radar satellites